Potens, a Latin word meaning powerful, confer potency, found in the word potentate, may refer to:

 Metriorhynchus potens, an extinct Late Jurassic metriorhynchid crocodile species
 Myolepta potens, a hoverfly species
 Psalodon potens, an extinct mammal species
 Purranisaurus potens, an extinct Late Jurassic metriorhynchid crocodile species
 Thylacinus potens, a prehistoric mammal species
 Titanophoneus potens, a prehistoric synapsid species